is a series of historical novels written by Japanese author Shōtarō Ikenami. Following the character Heizo Hasegawa in the Edo period of Japan, Ikenami wrote the first story for the December 1967 issue of the light novel magazine  published by Bungeishunjū. It was well-received and began serialization in January 1968. Ikenami wrote 19 books in the main series before he died in 1990. As of 2021, the series had 30 million copies in circulation.

Onihei Hankachō was also adapted into TV programs, a manga series, live-action films and theater productions. An anime television adaption aired in 2017.

Story
The title character is Heizo Hasegawa, a historical person who was a Hitsuke Tōzoku Aratamekata Chōkan (Superintendent General of the investigation agency specialized in theft and armed robbery and arson). He started as a chartered libertine before succeeding his father as his heir and being appointed the head of the special police who had jurisdiction over arson-robberies in Edo. Since there was no child between his father and the legitimate wife, he was brought to the Hasegawa family at the age of 17. Heizo was looked down upon by his step-mother saying that he was a child by a concubine. He rebelled against her and ran away from the house. He became the head of "the hoodlums" and led a fast life. His street name was "Honjo no Tetsu" which comes from his childhood name "Tetsusaburō." When his father died, he inherited his birthright and a villain eventually nicknamed him "Onihei," meaning "Heizō the demon,". He led a band of samurai police and cultivated reformed criminals as informants to solve difficult crimes. Later, he was titled "Hitsuke tōzoku aratamekata" (police force for arson and theft), and opened an office at his official residence. While he was called "demon" and was feared, he was forgiving and merciful to those who committed a crime out of necessity or are faithful even if they were criminals. He dedicated himself to establish and maintain the Ishikawajima Ninsoku Yoseba, a vocational training school for criminals, and served concurrently as a Yoseba magistrate for a while.

Four actors, Matsumoto Hakuō I, Tamba Tetsurō and Nakamura Kinnosuke also played the lead in Toho series on NET. More recently, Nakamura Kichiemon II, the younger son of Hakuō I, led a cast in Shochiku production on Fuji Television over 25 years, reputed as the best actor to portray Onihei which has been the highlight of his career aside from plays as a Kabuki actor.

The Fuji series ran from 1989 to 2001, with occasional short series and specials as recently as 2007. Until his death in 2001, Edoya Nekohachi III portrayed the informant Hikojū, often paired with Omasa (Meiko Kaji). Another informant was played by Chōsuke Ikariya. Yumi Takigawa was Hisae, wife of Onihei. Guests have included Akira Emoto, Frankie Sakai, Rokusaburo Michiba, Makoto Fujita, Shima Iwashita, Isuzu Yamada, Yoshizumi Ishihara, and Tetsuro Tamba. The series has been handed to Fuji on the broadcast satellite network (BS Fuji), after the show ended for Fuji on the terrestrial network.

Episodes
In all, 137 stories were published and made into TV programs, mainly by Fuji Television and NET Television (succeeded by Asahi Television). In addition, there are 11 special programs per year since 2005 combining several of those stories into a single episode, on consent by Ikenami himself. BS Fuji reruns serials with additional episodes. For Pay TV on a satellite television, SKY PerfecTV! Premium Service and Jidaigeki Senmon Channel co-produced four extra editions called "Onihei Gaiden". The producers shot the extra edition on film, as they knew Ikenami loved films and called himself a Cinemadict (addicted to cinema/film). 

Broadcast programs on satellite are: "Yousagi no Kakuemon" (2011), "Kumagorō no Kao" (2011/2012), "Shōgatsu Yokkano Kyaku" (2012/2013), and "Rōtō Ruten" (2013). A DVD is released for each episode.

Ikenami left a will that the scripts would be true to his Onihei novels, and that he prohibited any episode written by a scriptwriter on his/her own storyline so that when all original Onihei stories were made into scripts, the serial should be ended. The final Onihei episodes is planned as two Onihei Hankachō Specials, with episode #149 "Asakusa Mikuriyagashi" (December 18, 2015) and the final #150 shot in the summer of 2016 for broadcast in two segments in 2016-'17.

Adaptation

Television

Films
"Onihei Hankachō" was released on November 18, 1995, as a film to commemorate the 100th year since Shōchiku was established. DVD was produced later.

Theaters
Heizō was played by Matsumoto Kōshirō VIII (1970-1971), Takahashi Hideki (1978), and Nakamura Kichiemon II has personalized Heizō since the production of 1990. As the company belongs to Shōchiku aside from the 1978 production, most stages are brought on Meiji-za, where Kabuki is performed in Tokyo. Productions were brought to Minami-za in Kyoto as well as Misono-za in Nagoya, the theaters known to stage Kabuki plays as well.

"Onihei Hankachō", September 1970 at Teikoku gekijō. Matsumoto Kōshirō VIII as Heizō. As part of the 17 memorial for late Nakamura Kichiemon I. Script combined "", "", and "".
"", April 1971 at Meiji-za. Matsumoto Kōshirō VIII as Heizō.
"", November 1978 at Meiji-za. Takahashi Hideki as Heizō.
"Fox Fire", February 1990 at Kabukiza. Nakamura Kichiemon II as Heizō. A repeat performance of the 1971 production.
"", February 1991 at Shinbashi Enbujō. Nakamura Kichiemon II as Heizō.
"", February 1992 at Shinbashi Enbujō. Nakamura Kichiemon II as Heizō. Script combined the title work and "".
"", February 1993 at Shinbashi Enbujō. Nakamura Kichiemon II as Heizō. Guest stars Nakamura Matagorō (Minobino Kinosuke) and Nakamura Tomijūrō V (Kishii Samanosuke). Script combined the title work and "".
"The Woman of the Past", June 1994 at Kyoto Minami-za. A repeat performance of the 1993 production.
", February 1994 at Shinbashi enbujō. Nakamura Kichiemon II as Heizō. Script combined the title work and "".
"", March 1995 at Shinbashi enbujō. Nakamura Kichiemon II as Heizō. Guest star Ichikawa Sadanji IV (Gorozō). Script combined "", "", and "".
"Duel of Blood", June 1995 at Kyoto Minami-za. A repeat performance of the 1995 production.
"", May 2007 at Shinbashi Enbujō. Nakamura Kichiemon II as Heizō. Guest star Nakamura Karoku (Sendō Tomogorō).
"Retired Man at Ōkawa" April 2008 at Misonoza in Nagoya. A repeat performance of the 2007 production.
"Fox Fire", May 2009 at Shinbashi Enbujō. A repeat performance of the 1971 production.
"Retired Man at Ōkawa", June 2010 at Hakataza in Hakata. A repeat performance of the 2007 production.

Manga

 is a manga adaptation of Ikenami's novels, originally written by Sentaro Kubota and illustrated by Takao Saito. It has been published in Leed Publishing's Comic Ran magazine since 1993, with the collected volumes published by both Leed and Bungeishunjū. The story is true to Ikegami's original, with the exceptions of "", and the later works which combine Onihei stories with other titles by Ikegami. The story of "" is counted as part of the series.

The arranger was changed to Hisazumi Ohara since the May 2008 issue upon the death of Kubota. In 2012, JManga licensed the series for digital English release under the title Onihei, the Devilish Bureau Chief. By August 2019, the manga had 6.5 million copies in print. The manga was serialized continuously for 25 years until a mistake by the editorial department resulted in the September 2019 issue of Comic Ran becoming the first not to include a chapter. Saito died in September 2021, but Leed Publishing announced that Onihei Hankachō will continue without him per his wishes.

Arcade game
"" version 3.1 by Sega Interactive collaborates Onihei story where there is a deck of Heizō is modeled after Hasegawa Masanaga, who was the elder brother of Heizō's ancestor Hasegawa Nobutsugu.

DVD
 

From Onihei Hankachō - Special series;

Anime

An anime television series adaptation by Studio M2 aired from January 10, 2017 to April 4, 2017. The anime is directed by Shigeyuki Miya who also designs the characters. Masao Maruyama is credited as creative producer with TMS Entertainment in production. An OVA prequel was released on February 22, 2017. The theme song for this anime is Soshite....Ikinasai by Saori Yuki. Amazon Prime later added the anime series on the same day of the Japanese broadcast of premiere episode. An English dub of the anime was released on Tubi on April 15, 2021.

Characters
 
 The main character and head of the Arson Thief Control Office (ATC), who is shrewd, fair, and an expert swordsman, He is in charge of investigating and resolving arson and robbery cases throughout Edo.
 
 Son of Heizō and Hisae Hasegawa.
 
 Wife of Heizō Hasegawa.
 
 Young adopted daughter of Heizō and Hisae Hasegawa who was the daughter of a thief Heizo apprehended.
 
A former thief who became a spy working under Heizō's information network after he rescued her from her former accomplices.
 
One of the samurai dōshins under the ATC who uses a katana when on duty.
 
One of the samurai dōshins under the ATC who uses a katana when on duty.
 
 Senior officer and samurai in the ATC, in charge of the yorikis who uses a katana when on duty.
 
One of the samurai dōshins under the ATC who uses a katana when on duty.
 
 An old friend of Heizō who becomes a spy working in Heizō's information network.
 
An reformed ex-thief who was captured by Heizō, now working under the ATC directly. His rank is Okappiki.

Episode list

Notes

Footnotes

References

Further reading

External links
"Onihei Gaiden - Yousagi no Kakuemon" 
"Onihei Gaiden - Kumagorō no Kao" 
"Onihei Gaiden - Shōgatsu yokka no Kyaku" 
"Onihei Gaiden - Rōtō Ruten" 
Onihei Hankacho at IMDB
  
 

2017 anime television series debuts
Films based on Japanese novels
Japanese novels
Fuji TV original programming
TV Tokyo original programming
1989 Japanese television series debuts
2001 Japanese television series endings
Anime Strike
Samurai in anime and manga
Television shows based on Japanese novels
Historical anime and manga
1993 manga
Seinen manga
Jidaigeki